Pepsini is a tribe of spider wasps in the family Pompilidae.

Genera
Allaporus Banks, 1933
Caliadurgus Pate, 1946
Chirodamus Haliday, 1837
Cryptocheilus Panzer, 1806
Cyphononyx Dahlbom, 1845
Dichragenia Haupt, 1950
Dipogon Fox 1897
Entypus Dahlbom, 1843
Epipompilus Kohl, 1884
Guichardia Arnold, 1951
Hemipepsis Dahlbom, 1844
Java Pate, 1946
Minagenia Banks, 1934
Nipponodipogon Ishikawa, 1965
Paraclavelia Haupt, 1930
Pepsis Fabricius, 1804
Priocnemis Schiødte, 1837
Priocnessus Banks, 1925
Schistonyx Saussure, 1887 
Sphictostethus Kohl, 1884
Trachyglyptus Arnold, 1934 
Xenopepsis Arnold, 1932

References

Further reading

External links

 

Pepsinae